Abram Newkirk Littlejohn (December 13, 1824 – August 3, 1901) was the first bishop of the Episcopal Diocese of Long Island.

Biography
He was born in Florida, Montgomery County, New York and graduated from Union College, Schenectady in 1845. Littlejohn was ordained deacon on March 19, 1848, by William Heathcote DeLancey, and to the priesthood by Thomas Church Brownell on June 12, 1849. As a priest, his first parish was Christ Church (now Christ Church Cathedral), Springfield, MA. In 1868, he was elected Bishop of Central New York, but declined. He was consecrated Bishop of Long Island on January 27, 1869, and served in charge of the American Episcopal churches in Europe from 1874. In 1895, the Right Rev'd Littlejohn, among others, officiated at the wedding of Consuelo Vanderbilt to the Duke of Marlborough at St. Thomas Church, Fifth Avenue.

He died in Williamstown, Massachusetts on August 3, 1901, and was buried at All Saints Cemetery in Great Neck, New York.

References

External links
 
 
 Bibliographic directory from Project Canterbury

1824 births
1901 deaths
People from Florida, Montgomery County, New York
Union College (New York) alumni
19th-century American Episcopalians
Episcopal bishops of Long Island
19th-century American clergy